The Roman Catholic Archdiocese of Naples is a Roman Catholic archdioceses in southern Italy, the see being in Naples. A Christian community was founded there in the 1st century AD and the diocese of Naples was raised to the level of an Archdiocese in the 10th century.  Two of Archbishops of Naples have been elected Pope, Paul IV and Innocent XII.

References 

Naples